Emily Wick (December 9, 1921–March 21, 2013) was the first woman to reach the rank of tenured faculty at the Massachusetts Institute of Technology  (MIT). She taught in the Department of Nutrition and Food Science. Wick received her Ph.D. in chemistry from MIT in 1951 and became a tenured professor in 1963. She advocated on behalf of female students at MIT and was influential in getting coeducational residencies, so that with more living options more female applicants could be accepted.

Wick was also an avid sailor. She was the first woman commodore of the Sandy Bay Yacht Club in Rockport, Massachusetts, and the club's Race Committee boat was renamed the Emily Wick in 2012. At MIT she helped create the women's varsity sailing team, which was the first in the county to fund a coaching position dedicated to women sailors. In her honor, MIT alumnae organized the annual Emily Wick Regatta and the Emily L. Wick trophy which eventually became the Intercollegiate Women's Sailing Championship trophy.

Education and Employment
Wick received her BS (chemistry) and MA (organic chemistry) from Mount Holyoke College and her PhD (chemistry) from the Massachusetts Institute of Technology. While working for A.D. Little, a management consulting firm in Boston, MA, she "discovered the chemistry for foods we take for granted such as Miracle Whip and Campbell's soups."

Wick joined the MIT faculty as assistant professor in the Department of Nutrition and Food Science in 1959 and "developed food systems for the newly formed astronaut corps." In 1963 she was the first woman faculty member to receive tenure at MIT, and she became associate dean of students in 1965. She served as a member of the MIT Corporation from 1978 to 1983, and was its first female member.

Wick became dean of faculty at Mount Holyoke College in 1973 and later served as special assistant to the president for long-range planning before retiring in 1986.

Further reading
Margaret E. Layne: Women in Engineering: Pioneers and Trailblazers (2009)
Jill M. Bystydzienski (Editor), Sharon R. Bird (Editor): Removing Barriers: Women in Academic Science, Technology, Engineering, and Mathematics

References

External links
 Emily Wick Papers, MC-0696. Massachusetts Institute of Technology, Department of Distinctive Collections, Cambridge, Massachusetts.
 MIT, records of Associate Dean for Student Affairs Emily Wick, AC-0022. Massachusetts Institute of Technology. Department of Distinctive Collections, Cambridge, Massachusetts.

1921 births
2013 deaths
Massachusetts Institute of Technology School of Science faculty
Mount Holyoke College alumni
Massachusetts Institute of Technology School of Science alumni
American women chemists
21st-century American women